Storms is the fourth full-length studio album by Canadian pop rock band Hedley. It was preceded by the release of two top-20 singles, including lead single and second track "Invincible" in August 2011. The album was released in Canada on 8 November 2011 through Universal Music Canada. A critical and commercial success, the album debuted at No. 2 on the Top Canadian Albums chart. In May 2012, Storms was re-issued with a modified track listing that includes a third single and sixteenth track "Kiss You Inside Out".

Background
The album sees the group experimenting with elements of pop and rock music to create their most musically diverse soundscape yet, as well as the one with most overt pop overtones. Debuting at number two on the Canadian Albums Chart (edged out only by Michael Bublé's Christmas), it was Hedley's most successful album.

The sixth track "Beautiful" was first released on Hedley's live album Go With the Show in 2010. It was performed at the Metro Centre in Halifax. A Jumbotron video was also recorded and can be seen on the DVD, as a special feature.

Singles
The album produced two top-20 singles, the seventeenth and final track "Invincible" (featuring rapper P. Reign on the single release) and The lead track "One Life", before being re-issued in 2012 with the hit single and sixteenth track "Kiss You Inside Out". This last was met with critical acclaim and netted the band their highest chart peak to date.

Reception

The album debuted at number two on the Canadian Albums Chart, selling 23,000 copies. This was the biggest debut of the week, behind Michael Bublé's holiday album Christmas. This album marks the band's highest album chart peak. On 23 November 2011, the album was certified Gold by Music Canada, and on 23 December of the same year, it was certified Platinum. Storms won the Juno Award for Best Pop Album at the 2012 ceremony.

Track listing

Personnel
Jacob Hoggard – vocals, acoustic guitar, keyboard
Dave Rosin – electric guitar, textures, background vocals
Tommy Mac – bass, background vocals
Chris Crippin – drums, background vocals

Charts and certifications

Album

Weekly charts

Year-end charts

Certifications

Singles

Release history

References

2011 albums
Hedley (band) albums
Universal Music Canada albums
Juno Award for Pop Album of the Year albums